Panipat is a historic city in Haryana, India. It is 95 km north of Delhi and 169 km south of Chandigarh on NH-1. The three major battles fought in 1526, 1556 and 1761 took place near the city. The city is famous in India as the "City of Weavers" and "Textile City". It is also known as the "cast-off capital" due to being "the global centre for recycling textiles". Panipat is included in the list of Critically Polluted Industrial area in India. The Comprehensive Environment Pollution Index (CEPI) of the city is 71.91 as against 88.50 of Ankaleshwar (Gujarat). The fatal field of Panipat is the site of three battles that changed the course of India's history, resulting in the creation and confirmation of the Mughal Empire, as well as the decisive defeat of the Maratha Confederacy in North India.

History

Panipat district was carved out from the erstwhile Karnal district on 1 November 1989. On 24 July 1991 it was again merged with Karnal district. On 1 January 1992, it again became a separate district.

Panipat was the scene of three pivotal battles in Indian history. The First Battle of Panipat was fought on 21 April 1526 between Ibrahim Lodhi, the Afghan Sultan of Delhi, and the Turko-Mongol warlord Babur, who later established Mughal rule in Northern Indian subcontinent. Babur's force defeated Ibrahim's much larger force of over one lakh (one hundred thousand) soldiers. This first battle of Panipat thus ended the 'Lodi Rule' established by Bahlul Lodhi in Delhi. This battle marked the beginning of Mughal rule in India.

The Second Battle of Panipat was fought on 5 November 1556 between the forces of Akbar and Hem Chandra Vikramaditya, the last Hindu emperor of Delhi. Hem Chandra, who had captured states like Agra and Delhi defeating Akbar's army and declared himself as independent king after a coronation on 7 October 1556 at Purana Qila in Delhi, had a large army, and initially his forces were winning, but suddenly he was struck by an arrow in the eye and fell unconscious. On not seeing him in his howdah on the back of an elephant, his army fled. The unconscious Hemu was carried to Akbar's camp where Bairam Khan beheaded him. His head was sent to Kabul to be hanged outside Delhi Darwaza, and his torso was hanged outside Purana Quila in Delhi. The place of martyrdom of Raja Hemu is now a famous shrine in Panipat.

Panipat is listed in the Ain-i-Akbari as a pargana under Delhi sarkar, producing a revenue of 10,756,647 dams for the imperial treasury and supplying a force of 1000 infantry and 100 cavalry. It had a brick fort at the time which was also mentioned.

The Third Battle of Panipat was fought on 14 January 1761 between the Maratha Empire and the Afghan and Baloch invaders. The Maratha Empire forces were led by Sadashivrao Bhau and the Afghans were led by Ahmad Shah Abdali. The Afghans had a total strength of 110,000 soldiers, and the Marathas had 75,000 soldiers and 100,000 pilgrims. The Maratha soldiers were unable to get food because of non-cooperation of other empires of India. The Afghans were supported by Najib-ud-Daula and Shuja-ud-Daula for the supply of food, and the Maratha had pilgrims along with them, who were unable to fight, including female pilgrims. On 14 January, over 100,000 soldiers died resulting in the victory for the Afghans. However, after the victory, the Afghans facing a hostile North India, retreated to Afghanistan to avoid casualties. This battle served as a precursor for the East India Company to establish Company rule in India as most of North and Northwest Indian princely states were weakened.

Geography
It has an average elevation of 219 metres (718 feet).

Demographics

As per 2011 census, the city had a population of 294,292. Panipat's urban agglomeration had a population of 295,970. The literacy rate was about 83%.

{| class="wikitable sortable"
|+ Religion in Panipat City
|-
! Religion
! Population(1911)
! Percentage(1911)
! Population(1941)
! Percentage(1941)
|-
| Islam  
| 18,865
|
| 28,371
|
|-
| Hinduism 
| 6,707
|
| 8,584
|
|-
| Sikhism 
| 6
|
| 90
|
|-
| Christianity 
| 72 
|
| 12
|
|-
| Others 
| 692
|
| 780
|
|-
| Total Population
| 26,342
|
| 37,837
|
|}

Landmarks
Hemu's Samadhi Sthal

The wounded Hemu was captured by Shah Quli Khan in the Second Battle of Panipat and carried to the Mughal camp at Shodapur on Jind Road at Panipat. According to Badayuni, Bairam Khan asked Akbar to behead Hemu so that he could earn the title of Ghazi''. Akbar replied, "He is already dead, if he had any strength for a duel, I would have killed him." After Akbar's refusal Hemu's body was denied honour by the Mughal battle tradition and was unceremoniously beheaded by Bairam Khan. Hemu's head was sent to Kabul where it was hung outside the Delhi Darwaza while his body was placed in a gibbet outside Purana Quila in Delhi to terrorise his supporters, who were mainly his subjects, both the Muslims and Hindus.

Ibrahim Lodhi's Tomb
 
It was one of Sher Shah Suri's dying regrets that he could never fulfill his intention of erecting a tomb to the fallen monarch Ibrahim Lodhi. Much later, in 1866, the British relocated the tomb which was just a simple grave during construction of the Grand Trunk Road and added a platform to it with an inscription highlighting Ibrahim Lodhi's death in the Battle of Panipat.

Babur's Kabuli Bagh Mosque
 
The garden of Kabuli Bagh along with the Kabuli Bagh Mosque and a tank were built by Babur after the First Battle of Panipat to commemorate his victory over Ibrahim Lodhi. Some years later when Humayun defeated Sher Shah Suri near Panipat, he added a masonry Platform to it and called it 'Chabutra" Fateh Mubarak, bearing the inscription 934 Hijri (1557 CE). These buildings and the garden still exist under the name of Kabuli Bagh called so after Babur's wife – Mussammat Kabuli begum.

Kala Amb

According to tradition, the site 8 km from Panipat and 42 km from Karnal, where Sadashiv Rao Bhau commanded his Maratha forces during the third battle of Panipat was marked by a black Mango Tree (Kala Amb) which has since disappeared. The dark colour of its foliage was probably the origin of the name. The site has a brick Pillar with an iron rod and the structure is surrounded by an iron fence. The site is being developed and beautified by a society presided over by the Governor of Haryana.

Panipat Syndrome
The term "Panipat Syndrome" has entered the lexicon as the lack of strategic thinking, preparedness and decisive action by Indian leaders thus allowing an invading army to enter well inside their territory. This is based on the fact that in the three battles fought here, the defending armies were decisively defeated each time. It was coined by Air Commodore Jasjit Singh.

Connectivity

By Air 
The nearest airport is Indira Gandhi International airport is at a and distance of 99 km.
another way to connect is via Chandigarh International Airport distance from it is 160.5 km. later you can reach Panipat easily via cab,bus or train.

By Rail
Panipat junction is connected by a good railway network. Unchahar Express, Mussoorie Express, Jhelum Express, Shatabadi are some of the trains that stop at this junction.
For Railway Enquiry dial 139.

By Bus
Panipat is on the National Highway No. 1 and has excellent bus connections to all the cities and towns of the neighbouring states. Haryana Roadways Volvo buses pass through Panipat.
For Haryana Bus Enquiry : Dial 0180–2646544.
For Haryana Volvo Booking from Chandigarh or Delhi, log on to
www.hartrans.gov.in/online/index.asp

References

External links

 
Textile industry of India